Jahangir Hossain is a judge of the Appellate Division of Bangladesh Supreme Court..

Early life 
He was born on 31 December 1959 in Noakhali District, East Pakistan, Pakistan. He finished his LL.B and Masters in Commerce from the University of Dhaka.

Career 
In 1986, Hossain started worked as an advocate at the District and Session Judge's Court. In 1991, he started working as an advocate at the Bangladesh High Court. He worked as a special public prosecutor in Dhaka. He notably prosecuted the murder of the first President of Bangladesh, Sheikh Mujibur Rahman. On 18 April 2010, he was appointed as an Additional Judge on the Bangladesh High Court bench.

On 5 January 2012, Hossain and Justice AHM Shamsuddin Chowdhury, sentenced a university teacher to 6 months in jail over a Facebook post on which he wished the death of Prime Minister Sheikh Hasina. On 15 April 2012, his appointed was made permanent. On 29 August 2012, he was appointed as a judge to the International Crimes Tribunal-1 of the International Crimes Tribunal. He faced some controversy after Skype conversation where Chairman of Tribunal, Justice Mohammad Nizamul Huq, made disparaging comments about Hossain and called him corrupt, were leaked to the media. He elevated to the Appellate Division from High Court on December, 2022 by superseding many of his colleagues.

References 

1959 births
People from Noakhali District
University of Dhaka alumni
20th-century Pakistani lawyers
21st-century Pakistani judges
Living people
Supreme Court of Bangladesh justices